Nandi Annah Ndalane (born 1963) is a South African politician who has served in the Limpopo Executive Council since 2014 and in the Limpopo Provincial Legislature since 1999. She is currently serving, since October 2022, as Member of the Executive Council (MEC) for Social Development. 

Before her current position, Ndalane was MEC for Sports, Arts and Culture from 2014 to 2016; MEC for Transport, Safety and Security from 2016 to 2017; MEC for Public Works, Roads and Infrastructure from 2017 to 2019; and MEC for Agriculture and Rural Development from 2019 to 2022. She is a member of the African National Congress (ANC) and was formerly a local leader of the ANC in her home region of Vhembe; she also served a term as a member of the Limpopo ANC's Provincial Executive Committee from 2018 to 2022.

Early life and career 
Ndalane was born in June 1963 in Elim in Vhembe in present-day Limpopo province. In the final years of apartheid, she worked in community development at a local non-governmental organisation called Akanani. During the first post-apartheid elections in 1994, she served as a party agent on the winning campaign of the African National Congress (ANC), and she was subsequently elected as a local councillor in the Vuwani–Hlanganani Transitional Local Council.

Career in provincial government 
Ndalane was first elected as a Member of the Limpopo Provincial Legislature in the 1999 general election. While serving in the legislature, she rose through the ranks of the local ANC, becoming Deputy Regional Chairperson and later, from 2007, Regional Treasurer of the ANC's branch in Vhembe. In the fourth session of the Limpopo Provincial Legislature – following the 2009 general election, in which Ndalane was re-elected to her seat ranked 18th on the ANC's party list – she chaired the legislature's committee on sports, arts and culture.

In the 2014 general election, Ndalane was re-elected, on that occasion ranked 39th on the ANC's party list. She was also appointed to the Limpopo Executive Council by Stan Mathabatha, who had been elected to his first full term as Premier of Limpopo; she became Member of the Executive Council (MEC) for Sports, Arts and Culture. She held that position until a cabinet reshuffle on 15 September 2016, when she was moved to the Transport, Safety and Security portfolio. In October 2017, she was moved again, to the Public Works, Roads and Infrastructure portfolio, which was viewed as more senior. While in that office, at the ANC's provincial elective conference in June 2018, Ndalane was elected as an ordinary member of the Provincial Executive Committee of the Limpopo ANC.

In the 2019 general election, Ndalane was ranked 15th on the ANC's party list and was re-elected to the provincial legislature. She was also reappointed to Mathabatha's Executive Council, where she took up the post of MEC for Agriculture and Rural Development. At the ANC's next provincial elective conference in June 2022, she became one of several MECs who failed to gain re-election to the ANC Provincial Executive Committee, a development which was seen as rendering her politically vulnerable. In October 2022, Mathabatha transferred her to the Social Development portfolio.

References

External link 

 

1963 births
Living people
People from Vhembe District Municipality
21st-century South African politicians
African National Congress politicians
Members of the Limpopo Provincial Legislature